Simione Foliaki (born 10 March 1981, in Tonga) is a Tongan rugby league footballer who plays as a fullback for the Vaini Doves in the Tonga National Rugby League competition.

Foliaki has also appeared on several occasions for the Tonga national rugby league team. His most recent international games came during the 2006 Federation Shield competition; in one of these, a losing game against England, he was sent off,
.

References

1981 births
Living people
Tongan rugby league players
Tonga national rugby league team players
Rugby league fullbacks